Johnathan "Bug" Howard (born November 28, 1994) is an American football tight end for the Philadelphia Stars of the United States Football League (USFL). He played college football at North Carolina.

Early years
Howard, who was given the nickname "Bug" by his grandmother when he was a toddler, attended Wilcox County High School in Rochelle, Georgia.

College career
Howard caught 22 passes in his freshman season at North Carolina. Howard scored the first touchdown of the 2015 college football season, his junior year, when he caught a touchdown pass from quarterback Marquise Williams in their game against the South Carolina Gamecocks.

In his four-year career at UNC, Howard played in 46 games. He caught 146 passes for 2,048 yards and scored 18 touchdowns. He had just four dropped passes in four seasons at UNC.

Statistics

Professional career

Indianapolis Colts
After going undrafted in the 2017 NFL Draft, Howard was signed as a free agent by the Indianapolis Colts. He was waived by the Colts at the end of the 2017 preseason.

Cleveland Browns
On September 26, 2017, Howard was signed to the Cleveland Browns' practice squad. He signed a reserve/future contract with the Browns on January 1, 2018. He was waived by the Browns on April 12, 2018.

Carolina Panthers
On May 14, 2018, Howard signed with the Carolina Panthers. He was waived on August 31, 2018, as part of final roster cuts.

Atlanta Legends
On November 9, 2018, Howard signed with the Atlanta Legends of the Alliance of American Football (AAF) for the 2019 season.

Denver Broncos
After the AAF ceased operations in April 2019, Howard signed with the Denver Broncos on May 13, 2019, following a mini-camp tryout. He was placed on injured reserve on August 21, 2019. He was waived from injured reserve with an injury settlement on August 30, 2019. He was re-signed to the practice squad on December 4, 2019. He signed a reserve/future contract with the Broncos on December 31, 2019. He was waived on April 27, 2020.

Howard joined the Alphas of The Spring League for its 2020 Fall season.

Jacksonville Jaguars 
On December 14, 2020, Howard signed with the practice squad of the Jacksonville Jaguars. His practice squad contract with the team expired after the season on January 11, 2021.

Buffalo Bills
On July 30, 2021, Howard signed with the Buffalo Bills. He was waived on August 24, 2021.

Philadelphia Stars
Howard was drafted by the Philadelphia Stars of the United States Football League in the 18th round of the 2022 USFL Draft. He was placed on the "did not report" list on April 1, but joined the team for training camp three days later. He signed a contract with the team on April 7.

Tampa Bay Buccaneers
On July 29, 2022, Howard signed with the Tampa Bay Buccaneers. He was waived/injured on August 23 and placed on injured reserve. He was released on August 30.

Philadelphia Stars (second stint)
On February 8, 2023, Howard signed with the Philadelphia Stars of the United States Football League (USFL) for his second stint with the team.

Statistics

References

Living people
1994 births
People from Rochelle, Georgia
Players of American football from Georgia (U.S. state)
North Carolina Tar Heels football players
Indianapolis Colts players
Cleveland Browns players
Carolina Panthers players
Atlanta Legends players
Denver Broncos players
The Spring League players
Jacksonville Jaguars players
Buffalo Bills players
Philadelphia Stars (2022) players